Julius Leopold Fredrik Krohn (19 April 1835 – 28 August 1888) was a Finnish folk poetry researcher, professor of Finnish literature, poet, hymn writer, translator and journalist. He was born in Viipuri and was of Baltic German origin. Krohn worked as a lecturer on Finnish language in Helsinki University from the year 1875 and as a supernumerary  professor from 1885. He was one of the most notable researchers into Finnish folk poetry in the 19th century. His native language was German.

Life
Krohn's mother was Julie Dannenberg, a daughter of the Baltic German family at Kiiskilä manor near Vyborg. The versatile and talented Julie spoke eight languages and played the piano brilliantly. 
The other half of Julie Dannenberg's family was of Ingrian background.

Works and influence
Krohn mostly preferred not to write under his foreign surname, but either adopted a pen name or worked as part of a collective, such as the fennomans, of which he was a leading member. Using pseudonyms, he translated many of Johan Ludvig Runeberg's works into Finnish, and researchers also concluded that he penned the Finnish lyrics for the Finnish national anthem.

Under his most notable pseudonym Suonio he published poetry; e.g. Mansikoita ja mustikoita 1856–61 ("Strawberries and blueberries") and Kuun tarinoita ("Tales of the moon"). As Suonio, he worked as editor of Suomen Kuvalehti and translated many of Sir Walter Scott's novels, such as A Legend of Montrose.

Scientific work
An important contribution to a history of Finnish literature was Krohn's doctoral thesis Suomenkielinen runollisuus ruotsinvallan aikana (1862).
Krohn was also the first to develop a scientific method for the study of folklore, the historic-geographic method. This method, which is connected with nationalist understandings of folk culture, involves careful comparison of variant texts of an item of folklore to the end of identifying the "original" version (as well as its origin)

Julius Krohn died by drowning in Bay of Vyborg in a yachting accident at the age of 53. His work with folklore and the Finnish language was continued by his son Kaarle Krohn, who published much of his scientific work posthumously. This work was further developed by their student Antti Aarne.

Children

Apart from Krohn's son Kaarle, mentioned above, his son Ilmari became a composer of church music.
His daughter Aino married the Estonian nationalist Oskar Kallas and was known as a writer by the name Aino Kallas. His daughter Helmi Krohn, also an author, married Eemil Nestor Setälä, later the acting head of state of Finland in November 1917, after the abdication of Nicholas II of Russia.

Publications

Etext books on-line at the Project Gutenberg site
Yrjö Aukusti Wallin ja hänen matkansa Arabiassa (in Finnish) Non fiction work on the ethnographer and adventurer Georg August Wallin
Maksimilian Aukusti Myhrberg (in Finnish) 
Vanha tarina Montrosesta Finnish translation of A Legend of Montrose by Sir Walter Scott

References

On the history of comparison in folklore studies
Finnish Folklore Scholarship
Maantieteellis-historiallinen metodi at the University of Helsinki site (in Finnish)

External links
 
 
 
 

1835 births
1888 deaths
Writers from Vyborg
People from Viipuri Province (Grand Duchy of Finland)
Baltic-German people
Finnish people of German descent
Finnish scientists
19th-century Finnish poets
Finnish Lutheran hymnwriters
Finnish journalists
Fennomans
Translators from Swedish
Translators from German
Translators from English
Translators from Hungarian
Translators to Finnish
19th-century journalists
Male journalists
19th-century translators
19th-century male writers
Finnish male poets
Finnish folklorists
19th-century Lutherans